Boris Kok (born 20 May 1991) is a professional footballer who plays as a defender or defensive midfielder for Cambodian Premier League club Phnom Penh Crown and the Cambodia national team.

Personal life
Though born in Nancy, his parents hail from Kampong Cham and Battambang.

Club career
He began playing youth football with Tomblaine before continuing his youth development at AS Nancy Lorraine, Jarville JF, US Vandoeuvre, FC Toul and Nancy Olympic. Whilst at high school, his team won the French championships and they went on to represent France in the Schools World Cup in Chile. In 2012, he signed a professional contract with Phnom Penh Crown. In 2017, he became the first defender to score a hat-trick in the Cambodian League, after netting three times against EDCFC. He is currently serving as vice-captain of the club behind Orn Chanpolin. In 2022, he joined Malaysian Super League side Sarawak United on a season-long loan.

International career
He made his international debut in a friendly match against Bhutan on 20 August 2015.

Honours
Phnom Penh Crown
Cambodian League: 2014, 2015, 2021

References

1991 births
Living people
Cambodian footballers
Cambodia international footballers
French people of Cambodian descent
Sportspeople from Nancy, France
Association football defenders
Phnom Penh Crown FC players
Footballers from Grand Est
French expatriate footballers
Cambodian expatriate footballers
French expatriate sportspeople in Malaysia
Cambodian expatriate sportspeople in Malaysia
Expatriate footballers in Malaysia